Cock-a-leekie soup is a Scottish soup dish consisting of leeks and peppered chicken stock, often thickened with rice, or sometimes barley. The original recipe added prunes during cooking, and traditionalists still garnish with a julienne of prunes.

While it is called "Scotland's National Soup", it probably originated as a chicken and onion soup in France. By the late 16th century, it had made its way to Scotland, where the onions were replaced with leeks. The first recipe was printed in 1598, though the name "cock-a-leekie" did not come into use until the 18th century.

Traditionally, it is made with broiler fowl. These have very little flesh. Traditionally, the soup will not be loaded with vegetables nor thickeners. It would range from a clear stock to a green leek stock, with little flesh. The rich, chicken, vegetable and thickener versions seen today are produced largely because original cock a leekie is delicate, refreshing and difficult to make delicious. It is not the appetizing meal suggested by the modern version which is closer to chicken soup or stew. 

Cock a leekie soup, like a chicken and leek consome with a little flesh, and pieces of leek, is a traditional soup course at Burns’ Suppers.
 
There are vegetarian versions of this soup.  The vegetarian version has leeks and may include  mixed vegetables, chicken flavoured meat substitute and/or prunes.

History

The first known mention of this soup is from the Orchtertyre House Book (1737), an accounts book that recorded a dinner of 'cockie leekie fowlls in it'". The earliest recipe is from the Victorian era cookbook writer Isabella Beeton, and is thickened with "the fine part of oatmeal". Christian Isobel Johnstone (Meg Dods) said the soup "must be very thick of leeks and the first part of them must be boiled down into the soup until it becomes a lubricious compound".

See also
Chicken soup
Haggis
List of soups
Scotch broth

References

Scottish soups
Chicken dishes
Chicken soups
Leek dishes